Charles Errol "Roy" Fonseka is a Seychellois businessman and politician who is the current Minister of Home Affairs in the Cabinet of Seychelles. Before his venture into politics, he served 22 years in the British Armed Forces.

References 

Seychellois politicians
Year of birth missing (living people)
Living people